Claudia Felser (28 July 1962 in Aachen) is a German solid state chemist and materials scientist. She is currently a director of the Max Planck Institute for Chemical Physics of Solids. Felser was elected as a member into the National Academy of Engineering in 2020 for the prediction and discovery of engineered quantum materials ranging from Heusler compounds to topological insulators.

Education and career
Felser studied chemistry and physics at the University of Cologne, completing there both her diploma in solid state chemistry (1989) and her doctorate in physical chemistry (1994). After postdoctoral fellowships at the Max Planck Institute for Solid State Research in Stuttgart, Germany (1994-1995) with Arndt Simon and Ole Krogh Andersen, she moved to the Centre National de la Recherche Scientifique (CNRS) in Nantes, France (1995-1996), where she worked in the group of Jean Rouxel. Afterwards, she joined the Johannes Gutenberg University of Mainz in 1996 as an assistant professor (C1). She habilitated there in 2002 and was appointed to a full professor (C4) in 2003.

In 1999, she was a visiting professor at Princeton University and, in 2000, at the University of Caen.From 2009 to 2010 she was visiting professor at Stanford University and in 2019 visiting professor at Harvard University in the department Physics/ Applied Physics.

Since September 2011 she is a director of the Max Planck Institute for Chemical Physics of Solids and Professor hon. at the TU Dresden.

Research 
Her initial research interests include Heusler compounds and related filled tetrahedral structure types, the design, synthesis and physical investigation of new quantum materials, and materials for energy technologies (solar cells, thermoelectrics, catalysis, spintronics). The physical investigations are executed on bulk material, thin films and artificial superstructures.

Her current research focuses on relativistic materials science. Felser, along with collaborators, developed the field of topological quantum chemistry, which involves the design, synthesis, and realization of new multifunctional materials guided by theory. In particular, she focuses on new materials for quantum technologies such as topological insulators, Weyl and Dirac semimetals, skyrmions, superconductors, new fermions, and new quasiparticles (axions, majorana, parafermions, etc.).

Bibliography 
Three of her most-cited publications are:

Awards and honors
 2022: Member of the Academy od Sciences and Literature
 2002: Blaise Pascal Medal of the European Academy of Sciences    
 2022: Liebig commemorative coin of the GDCh (Gesellschaft Deutscher Chemiker)    
 2022: Max Born Medal and Prize of the German Physical Society (DPG) and the British Institute of Physics (IOP)
 2021: International Member of National Academy of Science (NAS), US
 2020: International Member of National Academy of Engineering  (NAE), US 
 2019: APS James C. McGroddy Prize for New Materials with Bernevig and Dai 
 2018: Member of the German National Academy of Sciences Leopoldina
 2016: Elected fellow of the IEEE (magnetic society)
 2015: Tsungming Tu Award
 2014: Alexander M. Cruickshank Lecturer Award
 2013: Elected American Physical Society (APS) fellow (Division of Condensed Matter Physics)
 2010: Nakamura Lecture Award of the University of California Santa Barbara
 2001: Order of Merit (Landesverdienstorden) of the federal state Rhineland-Palatinate for the foundation of the first NAT-LAB for school students at the University Mainz with a focus in female school students

She is the chairwoman of a German Research Foundation research group.  She was a member of the 13th Bundesversammlung (Germany).

Personal life 
Claudia Felser is married to the physicist Stuart S. P. Parkin. She has one daughter.

References

External links

1962 births
21st-century German chemists
21st-century German physicists
21st-century German women scientists
German women chemists
German women physicists
Living people
People from Aachen
Princeton University faculty
Academic staff of the University of Caen Normandy
University of Cologne alumni
Foreign associates of the National Academy of Sciences
Members of the German Academy of Sciences Leopoldina
German materials scientists
Solid state chemists
Chemical physicists
Materials scientists and engineers
Max Planck Society people
Max Planck Institute directors
Fellows of the American Physical Society